Nazario Sauro (20 September 1880 – 10 August 1916) was an Austrian-born Italian irredentist and sailor.

Life
Born in Capodistria, in what was then the Austrian Littoral (today Koper, Slovenia), he took to sailing from a very young age, and became the captain of a cargo ship when he was only 20. Later, in 1910, Sauro became an employee of the shipping company Zuttiati, connecting ports in Istria and Dalmatia to San Giorgio di Nogaro and Cervignano del Friuli.

After 1866 -when Venice and the republic of Venice region were annexed to Italy- there was some support for irredentism also in Istria, formerly a Venetian possession: Tino Gavardo, Pio Riego Gambini and Nazario Sauro were the most renowned of those who promoted Istrian unification to the Kingdom of Italy. Many of them enrolled voluntarily in the Italian Army during World War I against the Austrian Empire. Some were captured and hanged as traitors by the Austrians.

When World War I erupted, Sauro went to Venice, joining other refugees who had gathered in the city and were pressuring Italy to join the conflict on the Entente side. When Italy did join the effort in 1915, he was a volunteer in the Italian Navy, and assigned to a torpedo unit, accomplishing over 60 missions over a period of 14 months. In June 1916, he was promoted Sub-Lieutenant on the Giacinto Pullino submarine, and awarded a Silver Medal.

On 30 July of that year, Sauro's boat was sent over to carry out sabotage in the Hungarian port of Fiume (now Rijeka in Croatia), but it crashed into a rock in the Kvarner Gulf. The crew was intercepted by the Austro-Hungarian destroyer Satellit, and imprisoned. Sauro was recognized and placed on trial for his previous act of treason, and, after facing a military tribunal in Pola (now Pula in Croatia) was sentenced to death and hanged.

Nazario Sauro wrote two letters to his familiars from his cell; after his death Gabriele D'Annunzio asked for them to be displayed as permanent memory of Sauro's heroism.
They are currently displayed at the Central Museum of Risorgimento in Rome.
One of these, addressed to his wife, reads:

He is remembered as a hero of Italy. Two ships of the Italian Navy were named in his honour:

 The destroyer Nazario Sauro, built in 1926 and sunk in 1941
 The submarine Nazario Sauro, built in 1980 and taken out of service in 2009

See also

Italia irredenta
Istrian Italians
Risorgimento
Cesare Battisti
Guglielmo Oberdan
Istrian-Dalmatian exodus

References

Bibliography 
 Carlo Pignatti Morano. La vita di Nazario Sauro ed il martirio dell'eroe, Milano, Fratelli Treves Editori, 1922 
 Sem Benelli. Il Sauro, L'Eroica editrice. Trieste, 1919.
 Romano Sauro e Francesco Sauro, "Nazario Sauro. Storia di un marinaio", Venezia, La Musa Talìa, 2013.

External links 
 Official biography (in Italian)

1880 births
1916 deaths
People from Koper
People from Austrian Littoral
Istrian Italian people
Italian military personnel of World War I
Italian sailors
Regia Marina personnel
Italian irredentism
Recipients of the Gold Medal of Military Valor
20th-century executions for treason
Italian people executed abroad
Executed Austrian people
People executed for treason against Austria-Hungary
Executed Italian people
People executed by Austria-Hungary